Gerald L. Hart (January 31, 1935 - April 27, 2011) was an American football coach.  He was the 15th head football coach at Illinois State University in Normal, Illinois, serving for five seasons, from 1972 to 1976, and compiling a record of 26–27–1.

Prior to accepting the Illinois State head coaching position; Hart coached at a number of Illinois High Schools before moving on to coach at Southern Illinois University and Western Illinois University. He was also an assistant in the Canadian Football League, for both the Calgary Stampeders and the Saskatchewan Roughriders.

Head coaching record

References

2011 deaths
1935 births
Illinois State Redbirds football coaches
People from West Frankfort, Illinois
Coaches of American football from Illinois